State Route 74 (SR 74), part of which forms the Palms to Pines Scenic Byway or Pines to Palms Highway, and the Ortega Highway, is a state highway in the U.S. state of California. It runs from Interstate 5 in San Juan Capistrano in Orange County to the city limits of Palm Desert in Riverside County.

Route description
SR 74 begins at an interchange with I-5 in the city of San Juan Capistrano and heads east as the Ortega Highway, loosely paralleling San Juan Creek. The highway leaves the San Juan Capistrano city limits and turns northeast, going through the community of Rancho Mission Viejo and entering Ronald W. Caspers Wilderness Park and eventually Cleveland National Forest. After going through San Juan Hot Springs, SR 74 enters Riverside County.

The highway continues winding through the Santa Ana Mountains and passes through the community of El Cariso before descending into the city of Lake Elsinore. SR 74 continues northwest on Grand Avenue before continuing northeast on Riverside Drive and continuing along the shore of Lake Elsinore. The road continues southeast on Collier Avenue before continuing northeast on Central Avenue and intersecting I-15. SR 74 leaves the city of Lake Elsinore and continues through unincorporated Riverside County before turning east and entering Perris. After traveling through downtown, SR 74 merges with I-215 and runs concurrently with I-215 before exiting the freeway as Matthews Road.

SR 74 travels southeast through the Romoland area of Menifee and turns east to become Pinacate Road, continuing through Homeland and Green Acres before running concurrently with SR 79 as Florida Avenue through Hemet. SR 79 splits off and heads north towards San Jacinto while SR 74 continues through East Hemet and Valle Vista before entering the San Bernardino National Forest. The Palms to Pines Highway parallels San Jacinto Creek as it winds through the mountains before intersecting SR 243 in Mountain Center and providing access to the Hemet Reservoir. SR 74 follows the Garner Valley Wash through Garner Valley before meeting the eastern terminus of SR 371. The road crosses the Santa Rosa Indian Reservation before going through the communities of Gardenland and Pinyon Pines and turning north along Deep Canyon and becoming the western boundary of the University of California Desert Research Area.

As the highway descends to the Coachella Valley area, it parallels Carrizo Creek before entering the city limits of Palm Desert, where SR 74 meets its current legal eastern terminus. The SR 74 designation continued into Palm Desert as a city arterial to its eastern terminus at SR 111, which has also had its state highway designation removed through Palm Desert.

Route 74 passes through many parks and National Forests along its route. Some of these places include the San Bernardino National Forest, the Cleveland National Forest, the Ronald W. Caspers Wilderness Park, Lake Elsinore State Recreation Park, the Soboba Indian Reservation, Lake Hemet, Santa Rosa Indian Reservation, and Santa Rosa and San Jacinto Mountains National Monument.

SR 74 is part of the California Freeway and Expressway System, and for a portion near I-15 as well as from I-215 to the eastern Hemet city limits is part of the National Highway System, a network of highways that are considered essential to the country's economy, defense, and mobility by the Federal Highway Administration. SR 74 is eligible for the State Scenic Highway System; however, it is only a scenic highway as designated by Caltrans from the western boundary of the San Bernardino National Forest to its junction with SR 111. State Route 74 is called the California Wildland Firefighters Memorial Highway (from Lake Elsinore to San Juan Capistrano), as designated by various state laws. The Palms to Pines Scenic Byway is a National Forest Scenic Byway.

History

The route has been signed as Route 74 since the establishment of state routes in 1934. Its original corridor between then CA 71 Corona Freeway (later I-15W) and present-day I-215 (then, I-15E and U.S. Route 395) was numbered as U.S. 395, through downtown Perris. East of the CA 74/U.S. 395 junction, from Romoland-east, was CA 740 (Florida Avenue).

The western portion of Route 74 in Orange County follows San Juan Creek and is named the Ortega Highway, after the Spanish explorer Sgt. José Francisco Ortega who led the scouts of the 1769 Portola expedition, first non-natives to ever see the area.

A segment of Route 74 named "Seven Level Hill," just south of Palm Desert, California, appears in the 1963 American comedy film It's A Mad, Mad, Mad, Mad World during the opening minutes of the film, when the major characters of the film meet for the first time following a car accident.

Route 74 between San Juan Capistrano and Lake Elsinore, due to its narrow width and high traffic volume, holds an ominous claim to fame as one of the most dangerous highways in the state.

California's legislature has relinquished state control of segments of SR 74 in Perris and Palm Desert, and turned it over to local control. This includes deleting from the highway code an unconstructed segment that would have extended SR 74 from SR 111 to Interstate 10.

On August 11, 1930, the Riverside County Board of Supervisors officially named the highway "from San Jacinto Mountains to the Desert" as the Palms to Pines Highway.

Major intersections

See also

References

Further reading

External links

California @ AARoads.com - State Route 74
Caltrans: Route 74 highway conditions
California Highways: SR 74

074
State Route 074
State Route 074
074
U.S. Route 395
San Juan Capistrano, California
Lake Elsinore, California
Perris, California
Hemet, California
Palm Desert, California